Maria Mirou (born 13 May 1977) is a Greek table tennis player. She competed in the women's doubles event at the 2004 Summer Olympics.

References

External links
 

1977 births
Living people
Greek female table tennis players
Olympic table tennis players of Greece
Table tennis players at the 2004 Summer Olympics
Sportspeople from Piraeus